Mucajaí is a municipality located in the midwest of the state of Roraima in Brazil. Its population is 18,172 (2020) and its area is 12,461 km².

Mucajaí started as Colônia Agrícola Fernando Costa, an agricultural colony, in 1951. In 1980, Apiaú, a larger scale colony, was nearby. In 1982, it became an independent municipality and renamed Mucajaí.

The municipality contains part of the Roraima National Forest. In 2018, a mob attacked and expelled about 300 Venezuelan exiles after a local resident of Mucajaí was killed in a fight with a Venezuelan.

Sports
The local football club is Atlético Progresso Clube.

References

External links
 Official website (in Portuguese)
 

Municipalities in Roraima